John Groome  may refer to:

 John Groome (divine)
John Charles Groome (Maryland)
John Charles Groome (Pennsylvania)

See also
Groome